Ezhukone railway station (Code: EKN) is a railway station in Kollam district of Kerala state, India. Ezhukone railway station is coming under Madurai railway division of Southern Railway zone. It is one among the 26 railway stations in Kollam district.

Indian Railways connects Ezhukone with various cities in India like Kollam, Thiruvananthapuram, Kottayam, Ernakulam, Thrissur, Nagercoil, Tirunelveli, and Madurai, and with various towns like Punalur, Paravur, Kottarakkara, Kayamkulam, Karunagappalli, Varkala, Neyyattinkara, and Kanyakumari. All seven pairs of trains passing through have halts at Ezhukone railway station.

Significance
Ezhukone is a thickly populated area in Kollam district. Ezhukone railway station has gained significance because of it proximity to various schools, colleges, hospitals and Government offices in the locality. ESI Hospital in Ezhukone, Excise Range Office, Sree Naryana Guru Senior Secondary Central School etc. are very close to this railway station. The station serves areas like Pavithreswaram, Cheerankavu, Maranadu, Pochamkonam, Irumpanangadu, Neduvathoor, Neeleswaram, and Edakkidom.

Services

See also
 Kollam Junction railway station
 Paravur railway station
 Kundara railway station
 Kottarakara railway station

References

Ezhukone
Thiruvananthapuram railway division
1904 establishments in India
Railway stations opened in 1904